The Wanjiazhai Dam is a gravity dam on the Yellow River on the border of Pianguan County, Shaanxi Province (east bank) and Inner Mongolia Autonomous Region (west bank), China. The main purpose of the dam is water supply for the Wanjiazhai Water Control Project  along with peak hydroelectric power generation. Construction on the dam began in 1994, the first generator went online in 1998 and the last in 2000.

Construction
The State Planning Commission approved construction of the dam in 1993. At the end of 1994, construction on the dam began and by December 1995, the river was diverted around the construction site. On October 1, 1998, the dam began to impound the reservoir and the first generator went online on November 28, 1998. Two more generators went online in 1999 and the final three in 2000.

Dam design
The dam's power plant contains 6 x 180 MW Francis Turbine-generators for an installed capacity of 1,080 MW.

Wanjiazhai Water Control Project
Also known as the Wanjiazhai Water Transfer Project or Shanxi Wanjiazhai Yellow River Diversion Project, it is designed to alleviate water shortages in Taiyuan, Shuozhou and Datong and provide electricity for areas around the dam. At Xiatuzhai village, the General Main reaches a diversion sluice where it splits into the South Main and the North Main. The South Main is intended to deliver  of water a year. The North Main terminates at the Zhaojiaxiaocun Reservoir near Datong.

Contracts for the water control project were awarded in 2001 and by the end of the year, the first step was complete when Yellow River water flowed into the Fehne Reservoir. The entire cost of the project is $1.5 billion, $500 million is being funded by the World Bank.

See also 

 List of power stations in China

References

Hydroelectric power stations in Shaanxi
Dams in China
Gravity dams
Dams on the Yellow River
Dams completed in 1998